The 1981 Michigan Wolverines baseball team represented the University of Michigan in the 1981 NCAA Division I baseball season. The head coach was Bud Middaugh, serving his 2nd year. The Wolverines finished the season in 7th place in the 1981 College World Series.

Roster

Schedule 

! style="" | Regular Season
|- valign="top" 

|- align="center" bgcolor="#ccffcc"
| 1 || March 20 || vs  || Unknown • Miami, Florida || 9–3 || 1–0 || 0–0
|- align="center" bgcolor="#ffcccc"
| 2 || March 20 || vs New York Tech || Unknown • Miami, Florida || 0–1 || 1–1 || 0–0
|- align="center" bgcolor="#ccffcc"
| 3 || March 21 || vs  || Unknown • Miami, Florida || 15–6 || 2–1 || 0–0
|- align="center" bgcolor="#ffcccc"
| 4 || March 22 || at  || Unknown • Miami, Florida || 9–12 || 2–2 || 0–0
|- align="center" bgcolor="#ccffcc"
| 5 || March 23 || vs  || Unknown • Miami, Florida || 8–3 || 3–2 || 0–0
|- align="center" bgcolor="#ffcccc"
| 6 || March 23 || vs Maine || Unknown • Miami, Florida || 10–15 || 3–3 || 0–0
|- align="center" bgcolor="#ffcccc"
| 7 || March 24 || at Miami (FL) || Mark Light Field • Coral Gables, Florida || 2–3 || 3–4 || 0–0
|- align="center" bgcolor="#ccffcc"
| 8 || March 24 || vs  || Mark Light Field • Coral Gables, Florida || 8–0 || 4–4 || 0–0
|- align="center" bgcolor="#ccffcc"
| 9 || March 25 || vs  || Mark Light Field • Coral Gables, Florida || 9–2 || 5–4 || 0–0
|- align="center" bgcolor="#ffcccc"
| 10 || March 27 || vs Glassboro State || Mark Light Field • Coral Gables, Florida || 5–7 || 5–5 || 0–0
|- align="center" bgcolor="#ffcccc"
| 11 || March 27 || at Miami (FL) || Mark Light Field • Coral Gables, Florida || 3–12 || 5–6 || 0–0
|- align="center" bgcolor="#ccffcc"
| 12 || March 28 || vs FIU || Mark Light Field • Coral Gables, Florida || 11–6 || 6–6 || 0–0
|- align="center" bgcolor="#ffcccc"
| 13 || March 28 || at Miami (FL) || Mark Light Field • Coral Gables, Florida || 3–10 || 6–7 || 0–0
|- align="center" bgcolor="#ccffcc"
| 14 || March 31 ||  || Ray Fisher Stadium • Ann Arbor, Michigan || 12–2 || 7–7 || 0–0
|- align="center" bgcolor="#ccffcc"
| 15 || March 31 || Grand Valley State || Ray Fisher Stadium • Ann Arbor, Michigan || 10–4 || 8–7 || 0–0
|-

|- align="center" bgcolor="#ccffcc"
| 16 || April 1 ||  || Unknown • Unknown, Michigan || 5–3 || 9–7 || 0–0
|- align="center" bgcolor="#ccffcc"
| 17 || April 1 || Eastern Michigan || Unknown • Unknown, Michigan || 8–7 || 10–7 || 0–0
|- align="center" bgcolor="#ffcccc"
| 18 || April 3 || at  || Unknown • Oxford, Ohio || 2–3 || 10–8 || 0–0
|- align="center" bgcolor="#ccffcc"
| 19 || April 3 || at Miami (OH) || Unknown • Oxford, Ohio || 8–3 || 11–8 || 0–0
|- align="center" bgcolor="#ccffcc"
| 20 || April 7 ||  || Ray Fisher Stadium • Ann Arbor, Michigan || 2–1 || 12–8 || 0–0
|- align="center" bgcolor="#ffcccc"
| 21 || April 8 || vs  || Unknown • Unknown, Michigan || 3–4 || 12–9 || 0–0
|- align="center" bgcolor="#ffcccc"
| 22 || April 8 || vs Western Michigan || Unknown • Unknown, Michigan || 5–6 || 12–10 || 0–0
|- align="center" bgcolor="#ccffcc"
| 23 || April 11 || at  || Trautman Field • Columbus, Ohio || 7–2 || 13–10 || 1–0
|- align="center" bgcolor="#ffcccc"
| 24 || April 11 || at Ohio State || Trautman Field • Columbus, Ohio || 3–7 || 13–11 || 1–1
|- align="center" bgcolor="#ccffcc"
| 25 || April 12 || at Ohio State || Trautman Field • Columbus, Ohio || 8–3 || 14–11 || 2–1
|- align="center" bgcolor="#ccffcc"
| 26 || April 12 || at Ohio State || Trautman Field • Columbus, Ohio || 4–2 || 15–11 || 3–1
|- align="center" bgcolor="#ccffcc"
| 27 || April 14 ||  || Ray Fisher Stadium • Ann Arbor, Michigan || 6–5 || 16–11 || 3–1
|- align="center" bgcolor="#ccffcc"
| 28 || April 15 || vs Western Michigan || Unknown • Unknown, Michigan || 5–2 || 17–11 || 3–1
|- align="center" bgcolor="#ccffcc"
| 29 || April 15 || vs Western Michigan || Unknown • Unknown, Michigan || 8–2 || 18–11 || 3–1
|- align="center" bgcolor="#ccffcc"
| 30 || April 18 ||  || Ray Fisher Stadium • Ann Arbor, Michigan || 6–2 || 19–11 || 4–1
|- align="center" bgcolor="#ccffcc"
| 31 || April 18 || Indiana || Ray Fisher Stadium • Ann Arbor, Michigan || 8–1 || 20–11 || 5–1
|- align="center" bgcolor="#ffcccc"
| 32 || April 19 || Indiana || Ray Fisher Stadium • Ann Arbor, Michigan || 3–4 || 20–12 || 5–2
|- align="center" bgcolor="#ccffcc"
| 33 || April 19 || Indiana || Ray Fisher Stadium • Ann Arbor, Michigan || 9–1 || 21–12 || 6–2
|- align="center" bgcolor="#ccffcc"
| 34 || April 21 ||  || Ray Fisher Stadium • Ann Arbor, Michigan || 4–2 || 22–12 || 6–2
|- align="center" bgcolor="#ccffcc"
| 35 || April 22 || Cleveland State || Ray Fisher Stadium • Ann Arbor, Michigan || 2–1 || 23–12 || 6–2
|- align="center" bgcolor="#ccffcc"
| 36 || April 22 || Cleveland State || Ray Fisher Stadium • Ann Arbor, Michigan || 9–1 || 24–12 || 6–2
|- align="center" bgcolor="#ccffcc"
| 37 || April 23 ||  || Ray Fisher Stadium • Ann Arbor, Michigan || 2–0 || 25–12 || 6–2
|- align="center" bgcolor="#ccffcc"
| 38 || April 23 || Detroit || Ray Fisher Stadium • Ann Arbor, Michigan || 11–0 || 26–12 || 6–2
|- align="center" bgcolor="#ccffcc"
| 39 || April 25 || vs  || Unknown • Unknown, Michigan || 3–2 || 27–12 || 6–2
|- align="center" bgcolor="#ccffcc"
| 40 || April 25 || vs Ferris State || Unknown • Unknown, Michigan || 6–2 || 28–12 || 6–2
|-

|- align="center" bgcolor="#ccffcc"
| 41 || May 2 ||  || Ray Fisher Stadium • Ann Arbor, Michigan || 5–1 || 29–12 || 7–2
|- align="center" bgcolor="#ccffcc"
| 42 || May 2 || Purdue || Ray Fisher Stadium • Ann Arbor, Michigan || 5–1 || 30–12 || 8–2
|- align="center" bgcolor="#ffcccc"
| 43 || May 3 || Purdue || Ray Fisher Stadium • Ann Arbor, Michigan || 1–3 || 30–13 || 8–3
|- align="center" bgcolor="#ccffcc"
| 44 || May 3 || Purdue || Ray Fisher Stadium • Ann Arbor, Michigan || 5–2 || 31–13 || 9–3
|- align="center" bgcolor="#ffcccc"
| 45 || May 5 || vs  || Unknown • Unknown || 2–3 || 31–14 || 9–3
|- align="center" bgcolor="#ffcccc"
| 46 || May 6 || vs Eastern Michigan || Unknown • Unknown, Michigan || 3–7 || 31–15 || 9–3
|- align="center" bgcolor="#ccffcc"
| 47 || May 6 || vs Eastern Michigan || Unknown • Unknown, Michigan || 7–2 || 32–15 || 9–3
|- align="center" bgcolor="#ccffcc"
| 48 || May 9 || at  || John H. Kobs Field • East Lansing, Michigan || 7–2 || 33–15 || 10–3
|- align="center" bgcolor="#ffcccc"
| 49 || May 9 || at Michigan State || John H. Kobs Field • East Lansing, Michigan || 6–8 || 33–16 || 10–4
|- align="center" bgcolor="#ccffcc"
| 50 || May 12 || vs Wayne State || Unknown • Unknown, Michigan || 5–3 || 34–16 || 10–4
|- align="center" bgcolor="#ffcccc"
| 51 || May 12 || vs Wayne State || Unknown • Unknown, Michigan || 3–5 || 34–17 || 10–4
|-

|-
|-
! style="" | Postseason
|- valign="top"

|- align="center" bgcolor="#ccffcc"
| 52 || May 15 ||  || Ray Fisher Stadium • Ann Arbor, Michigan || 4–3 || 35–17 || 10–4
|- align="center" bgcolor="#ccffcc"
| 53 || May 16 || Purdue || Ray Fisher Stadium • Ann Arbor, Michigan || 7–6 || 36–17 || 10–4
|- align="center" bgcolor="#ccffcc"
| 54 || May 23 ||  || Ray Fisher Stadium • Ann Arbor, Michigan || 10–6 || 37–17 || 10–4
|-

|- align="center" bgcolor="#ffcccc"
| 55 || May 22 ||  || Ray Fisher Stadium • Ann Arbor, Michigan || 1–2 || 37–18 || 10–4
|- align="center" bgcolor="#ccffcc"
| 56 || May 23 ||  || Ray Fisher Stadium • Ann Arbor, Michigan || 6–2 || 38–18 || 10–4
|- align="center" bgcolor="#ccffcc"
| 57 || May 24 || New Orleans || Ray Fisher Stadium • Ann Arbor, Michigan || 7–1 || 39–18 || 10–4
|- align="center" bgcolor="#ccffcc"
| 58 || May 24 || Eastern Michigan || Ray Fisher Stadium • Ann Arbor, Michigan || 10–0 || 40–18 || 10–4
|- align="center" bgcolor="#ccffcc"
| 59 || May 25 || Eastern Michigan || Ray Fisher Stadium • Ann Arbor, Michigan || 4–0 || 41–18 || 10–4
|-

|- align="center" bgcolor="#ffcccc"
| 60 || May 30 || vs  || Johnny Rosenblatt Stadium • Omaha, Nebraska || 0–4 || 41–19 || 10–4
|- align="center" bgcolor="#ffcccc"
| 61 || June 2 || vs Texas || Johnny Rosenblatt Stadium • Omaha, Nebraska || 5–6 || 41–20 || 10–4
|-

Awards and honors 
Scot Elam
 First Team All-Big Ten

Tony Evans
 First Team All-Big Ten

Jim Paciorek
 First Team All-Big Ten

References 

Michigan Wolverines baseball seasons
Michigan Wolverines baseball
College World Series seasons
Big Ten Conference baseball champion seasons
Michigan